Michael David Mizrachi (born January 5, 1981) is an American professional poker player who won the 2010, 2012 and 2018 World Series of Poker $50,000 Players Championship. Mizrachi also has two World Poker Tour titles, and he finished 5th in the Main Event of the 2010 World Series of Poker. In January 2013, Mizrachi signed on as a team pro member with Lock Poker.

Personal life
Mizrachi was born in Miami, Florida. He is the younger brother of Robert Mizrachi who has numerous World Series of Poker and World Poker Tour finishes to his own name. He has a twin brother Eric Mizrachi (also a poker player) and a younger brother, Daniel Jay Mizrachi, who is a professional DJ also known as DJ Mizrachi. Mizrachi is fluent in Hebrew, as his father is of Iraqi Jewish origin Ezra Mizrachi. Growing up, Mizrachi wanted to become a doctor but dropped out of college to play poker full-time.

Mizrachi has three children: Paul William (named after his grandfather), Julie and Joseph Mizrachi. He lives in Hollywood, Florida. He purchased a motor home out of his poker winnings which he used to keep his family near him when he was on the road, but eventually sold it as it was depreciating in value. In early 2010, a federal tax lien in the amount of $339,711 was filed against Mizrachi for unpaid taxes related to his earnings from 2005 to 2007.  Mizrachi also had two residential properties in Florida foreclosed on including a condominium he owned with his brother, Robert. In 2016, Aidiliy Mizrachi, his wife, divorced Michael for irreconcilable differences.

Poker
In 2006, Mizrachi won CardPlayer Magazine's Player of the Year Award.

Live poker

Tournaments
As of January 2020, Mizrachi's live tournament winnings exceed $17,000,000. His 64 cashes at the WSOP account for $9,169,857 of those winnings.

World Series of Poker
In the 2005 World Series of Poker (WSOP), Mizrachi tied the record of seven money finishes in a single year. In the 2008 World Series of Poker, he finished third in the $10,000 Pot-Limit Omaha World Championship. In 2010, Mizrachi won his first bracelet in The Poker Player's Championship, defeating Vladimir Shchemelev heads-up and winning $1,559,046.  His brother Robert Mizrachi finished 5th in the same event. Later that year, Mizrachi also made the November Nine in the Main Event.  He would go on to finish 5th, earning $2,332,992, and was eliminated by eventual winner Jonathan Duhamel.  Despite his strong performance at the 2010 WSOP, Frank Kassela was awarded the Player of the Year award based on the pre-existing scoring system.  This was controversial because some felt that Mizrachi's year was better, which resulted in a refinement of the scoring system. Mizrachi's success in 2010 led to ESPN poker announcer Norman Chad labelling it "The Year of The Grinder".

In 2011, Mizrachi just missed winning another WSOP title when he took 2nd in the $2,500 Omaha/Stud Eight or Better event for $158,148.

At the 2011 WSOPE, Mizrachi won his second bracelet in the €10,400 No Limit Hold'em (Split Format) by defeating Shawn Buchanan in heads up play, earning €336,008.

Mizrachi made three final tables At the 2012 World Series of Poker and won his second $50,000 Poker Player's Championship title, earning $1,451,527, becoming the event's first 2 time champion in the process.

The 2013 WSOP Africa saw Mizrachi win $3,300 Main Event for $101,267.

In 2018, Mizrachi won the Poker Player's Championship for a record setting 3rd time, earning $1,239,126.

In 2019, Mizrachi won his fifth bracelet in Event #27: Seven Card Stud Hi-Lo 8 or Better, besting a field of 460 players for $142,801.

An "E" following a year denotes bracelet(s) won at the World Series of Poker Europe

World Poker Tour
In January 2005, Mizrachi finished fifth in the World Poker Tour (WPT) World Poker Open at a table also featuring Daniel Negreanu and Scotty Nguyen. The next month, he won a first prize of $1,859,909 at the L.A. Poker Classic, defeating a final table including Ted Forrest and Erick Lindgren. He also finished 11th place (out of 452 entrants) in the $25,000 WPT Championship.

Cash games
Mizrachi played during the second season of High Stakes Poker.

Awards
He was named 2010 Poker Player of the Year in ALL IN Magazine.

Notes

External links

Official site
InsidePoker magazine interview

1981 births
American poker players
World Series of Poker bracelet winners
Sportspeople from Miami
American people of Iraqi-Jewish descent
Living people
World Poker Tour winners
People from Miramar, Florida
Sportspeople from Broward County, Florida